The 2004 Croatian Figure Skating Championships ( were the National Championships of the 2003–04 figure skating season. Skaters competed in the disciplines of men's singles and ladies' singles.

Senior results

Men

Ladies

* Željka Krizmanić and Helena Pozojevic placed first and second respectively in the junior competition, and the ISU recognizes them as the senior silver and bronze medalists.

External links
 results

Croatian Figure Skating Championships
Croatian Figure Skating Championships, 2004